Vlasyevo is a rural locality (a village) in Kiprevskoye Rural Settlement, Kirzhachsky District, Vladimir Oblast, Russia. The population was 3 as of 2010. There are 5 streets.

Geography 
Vlasyevo is located on the Vakhchilka River, 14 km northeast of Kirzhach (the district's administrative centre) by road. Baburino is the nearest rural locality.

References 

Rural localities in Kirzhachsky District